Xerocrassa ebusitana is a species of air-breathing land snail, a pulmonate gastropod mollusk in the family Geomitridae.

Distribution

This species is endemic to Spain, where it occurs on the Balearic islands of Ibiza and Formentera and their surrounding minor islands.

References

 Bank, R. A.; Neubert, E. (2017). Checklist of the land and freshwater Gastropoda of Europe. Last update: July 16th, 2017

External links

ebusitana
Molluscs of Europe
Endemic fauna of the Balearic Islands
Gastropods described in 1869